KCMR (Inspiration 97.9 FM) is a Christian radio station licensed to serve the community of Mason City, Iowa, United States. KCMR is owned by TLC Broadcasting Corporation, a non-profit corporation.

External links

 KCMR website

Mason City, Iowa
CMR